German submarine U-37 was a Type IXA U-boat of the German Navy (Kriegsmarine) during World War II. The submarine was laid down on 15 March 1937 at the DeSchiMAG AG Weser yard in Bremen, launched on 14 May 1938, and commissioned on 4 August 1938 under the command of Kapitänleutnant Heinrich Schuch as part of the 6th U-boat Flotilla.

U-37 was then withdrawn from front-line service and assigned to training units until the end of the war. On 8 May 1945 the U-boat was scuttled in Sonderburg Bay, off Flensburg. U-37 was the sixth most successful U-boat in World War II.

Design
As one of the eight original German Type IX submarines, later designated IXA, U-37 had a displacement of  when at the surface and  while submerged. She had two shafts and two  propellers.

The boat had a complement of forty-eight.

Service history

First patrol
U-37 left Wilhelmshaven, with Kapitänleutnant Heinrich Schuch in command, on 19 August 1939. The boat operated for nearly four weeks in the North Atlantic, returning to port on 15 September 1939.

Second patrol
U-37 left Wilhelmshaven on 5 October 1939 to conduct operations in the North Atlantic now under the command of Korvettenkapitän Werner Hartmann. During this patrol she sank eight ships: four British, two Greek, one French and one Swedish, including the British steam freighter Yorkshire which was traveling with the Allied convoy HG-3, sailing from Gibraltar to Liverpool, England. Hartmann returned his boat to port on 8 November after nearly five weeks at sea.

Third patrol
On 1 January 1940 U-37 was reassigned to the 2nd U-boat Flotilla based at Wilhelmshaven. On 28 January 1940 the U-boat departed for the North Atlantic, with Werner Hartmann in command. As on his previous patrol, Hartmann sank eight ships, this time three British, two Norwegian, one Danish, one French and one Greek. Of these ships, two were in convoy at the time. U-37 returned to Wilhelmshaven on 27 February.

Fourth patrol

U-37 departed Wilhelmshaven on 30 March for Werner Hartmann's third consecutive patrol, this time around Norway. Again, Hartmann proved successful, sinking three ships; the Norwegian Tosca, the Swedish Sveaborg and the British Stancliffe. After patrolling for over two weeks, the U-boat returned to Wilhelmshaven on 18 April.

Fifth patrol
Under a new captain, Kapitänleutnant Victor Oehrn, U-37 departed from Wilhelmshaven on 15 May for a patrol around Portugal and Spain. U-37 had her most successful mission, hitting eleven ships, sinking ten of them. Three French ships were sunk, two Greek, two British, one Swedish, one Argentinian, one Finnish; one British ship was damaged. After three and a half weeks at sea, U-37 returned to Wilhelmshaven on 9 June.

The neutral Argentinian ship was Uruguay, sailing from Rosario to Limerick with a cargo of maize. U-37 surfaced and stopped Uruguay and examined her papers, then sank her with scuttling charges. Her crew of 28 were left in their lifeboats. Fifteen died, 13 survived.

Sixth patrol
U-37 sailed from Wilhelmshaven on 1 August, again with Victor Oehrn in command. This week and a half long patrol in the Atlantic off the west coast of Ireland resulted in the sinking of a single British ship, Upwey Grange. U-37 returned to port on 12 August, but rather than head back to Wilhelmshaven, she made for Lorient in France, where the 2nd U-boat Flotilla was now based.

Seventh patrol
For the first time, U-37 began a patrol from a location other than Germany, in Lorient on 17 August, with Victor Oehrn in command once more. It was to focus on operations off the south-west coast of Ireland. Seven ships were sunk during this voyage; five of which were British, one Norwegian, and one Greek. Of these ships, one was from convoy OA 220, the British Brookwood, traveling from Britain to the Australia, two were from convoy SC 1, the British sloop  and Blarimore, sailing from Sydney, Nova Scotia, Canada, to the United Kingdom. After two weeks at sea, U-37 returned to Lorient on 30 August.

Eighth patrol
On 24 September, U-37 departed Lorient on Victor Oehrn's fourth patrol, in which he would sail to the North Atlantic. During this month-long operation U-37 sank six ships, four of which were in convoy at the time of attack, all of which were British. Five of these six ships were sailing under the British flag, while the sixth was from Egypt. The British ship Corrientes was sunk as part of OB-217, sailing from Liverpool to North America. Heminge was sailing as part of OB-220, also sailing from Liverpool to North America. British General was sunk while sailing as part of convoy OA 222, sailing from Britain to North America. The fourth ship sunk was the British Stangrant, sailing as part of convoy HX 77 from Halifax to the United Kingdom. The U-boat returned to Lorient on 22 October.

Ninth patrol
After over a month in port, U-37 departed with a new captain, Oberleutnant zur See Asmus Nicolai Clausen on 28 November for operations around north-west Africa and Spain. Seven ships were sunk during this patrol; two French, two Swedish, two British and one Spanish. Of these seven ships, three were in convoy at the time of their sinking. The Swedish Gwalia and Daphne and the British Jeanne M were sailing as part of convoy OG 46 from Britain to Gibraltar. The French vessels, the oiler Rhône and the submarine Sfax belonged to Vichy France and were sunk in error. After five weeks on the high seas, U-37 returned to Lorient on 14 January 1941.

Tenth and eleventh patrols
U-37 left Lorient on 30 January 1941 to patrol off the coast of Portugal. On 8 February she spotted Convoy HG-53. The next day, U-37 sank two British ships, Courland and Estrellano. The third merchant vessel that U-37 sank on her tenth patrol was the British ship Brandenburg, on 10 February. The U-boat then returned to Lorient on 18 February after spending 20 days at sea and sinking 4,781 GRT of shipping.

Leaving Lorient for the final time on 27 February 1941, U-37s last patrol took her to the waters south of Iceland. There she sank two vessels, the Greek cargo ship Mentor on 7 March, and the Icelandic trawler Pétursey on the 12th. After spending 24 days at sea, U-37 entered the port of Kiel on 22 March.

Training boat
On 1 May 1941 U-37 was reassigned to the 26th U-boat Flotilla, based at Pillau (now Baltiysk, Russia) as a training U-boat. She was transferred to the 22nd U-boat Flotilla, based at Gotenhafen (now Gdynia, Poland) on 1 April 1942, and finally to the 4th U-boat Flotilla on 1 July 1944, where she remained until the end of the war.

She was scuttled by her crew on 8 May 1945.

Film Portrayals
The British war propaganda film 49th Parallel (1941) uses the name U-37 for the German submarine whose crew comes ashore in Canada during WW2. The craft is shown being blown up in Hudson Bay. The film was released shortly after the real U-37 was removed from active service.

In the 1943 war film Action in the North Atlantic, the U-boat in the opening scenes is titled U-37.

Summary of raiding history

References

Notes

Citations

Bibliography

External links

 UFA Newsreel of Werner Hartmann and U-37 in 1940 

German Type IX submarines
U-boats commissioned in 1938
World War II submarines of Germany
1938 ships
Ships built in Bremen (state)
Operation Regenbogen (U-boat)
Maritime incidents in May 1945